Eóghan Caoch mac Ruaidhrí Ó Dubhda, Chief of the Name and Lord of Tireragh, died 1488?

Even when dates and/or lengths of reigns are given, they can only be approximated as some chiefs may have ruled in opposition to each other. 

 gives Eóghan Caoch mac Ruaidhrí
"14" years.

References

 /Some of the princes of Ui Dhubhda, pp. 676–681, Leabhar na nGenealach: The Great Book of Irish Genealogies, Dubhaltach Mac Fhirbhisigh (died 1671), eag. Nollaig Ó Muraíle, 2004–05, De Burca, Dublin.

External links
 http://www.ucc.ie/celt/published/T100005C/index.html

Medieval Gaels from Ireland
People from County Mayo
People from County Sligo
15th-century Irish people
Irish lords